Mao Zedong (26 December 1893  9 September 1976), also known as Chairman Mao, was a Chinese communist revolutionary who became the founder of the People's Republic of China (PRC), which he ruled as the Chairman of the Chinese Communist Party from its establishment in 1949 until his death on 9 September 1976, at the age of 82.

Death 
Mao's last public appearance — and the last known photograph of him alive — was on 27 May 1976, when he (frail and barely able to speak or walk) met the visiting Pakistani Prime Minister Zulfikar Ali Bhutto during the latter's visit to Beijing.
At around 17:00 on 2 September 1976, Mao had a heart attack, far more severe than his previous two earlier that year which affected a much larger area of his heart. Three days later on 5 September, another heart attack rendered him bedridden. On the afternoon of 7 September, Mao's condition completely deteriorated. Mao's organs failed quickly and he fell into a coma shortly before noon where he was put on ventilator and life support machines. On 8 September when the comatose Mao was beyond recovery, Chinese government officials decided to disconnect his life support machines at midnight.

After the life support machines were turned off at exactly 00:00, Mao Zedong was pronounced dead ten minutes later at 00:10 local time on 9 September 1976 at age 82. The Chinese Communist Party delayed the announcement of his death until 16:00 later that day, when a radio message broadcast across the nation announced the news of Mao's passing while appealing for party unity. 

The Chinese government ordered a week of national mourning with flags at half-mast. All entertainment and music activities were suspended and theaters were closed.

Reactions 
 – The Central Committee of the Albanian Party of Labour and the Albanian Government declared the period from September 16 to 18 as days of national mourning, during which flags would be flown at half-mast and there would be no recreational or sports activities.

 – Governor-General Sir John Kerr said "I know that every member of the Chinese nation today is like a family who lost one of the most respected parents," Prime Minister Malcolm Fraser said "With his guidance and encouragement, China has regained its national dignity and international prestige."

 – Government of Democratic Kampuchea decided on national mourning from September 12 to 18.

 – President Valéry Giscard d'Estaing said, "He (Mao) has freed China from the humiliation of the past and restored China's central position given to her by history. France will not forget that it was Chairman Mao Zedong and General De Gaulle who deeply admired him that led to the mutual development of our two countries."

 – Prime Minister Indira Gandhi said, "The Government and people of India join me in sending you our sincere condolences on the death of Chairman Mao Tse-tung. He was an eminent statesman who led the resurgence and progress of the Chinese people."

 – Prime Minister Takeo Miki and others went to the Chinese Embassy to personally mourn and issued a statement saying that "Now, when Japan-China relations are developing, they have lost this great leader and sincerely feel sorry", and Xinhua News Agency is also official in Japan. After releasing great goodwill, he reiterated Beijing's support for Japan's claim to recover the four northern islands occupied by the Soviet Union.

 (DPRK) – On September 9, 1976, General Secretary and President Kim Il-sung sent a telegram of condolence to the Chinese Communist Party which said "During the liberation of the motherland and the fierce struggle of the Korean people against the US imperialist armed aggressors, Comrade Mao Zedong smashed all obstacles of the domestic and foreign enemies, set off a campaign against the United States and aided the DPRK, and used blood to aid the just struggle of our people." The North Korean government also designated September 10–18 as a national mourning period, with a half-flag mourning and a large-scale mourning event.

 – On September 9, President Fazal Ilahi Chaudhry issued a statement: "As the father of the Chinese revolution that has changed the lives of a quarter of the human race, Chairman Mao is one of the most outstanding leaders of all time. As a politician and thinker, he has left an indelible mark on the annals of mankind. His death is not only a huge loss to the Chinese people, but also to the people of all countries in the world." Pakistani Prime Minister Bhutto said, "Chairman Mao Zedong has always been concerned about the happiness and progress of Pakistan. This makes him live forever in our hearts. The Pakistani people mourn the death of this great man together with the brotherly Chinese people." Pakistani government has ordered seven days of mourning with flags half mast.

 – Highest Supreme Body of the People's Republic of Congo met on September 10 when a 5-point decision was made laid the national mourning after the death of Chairman Mao Tsetung. September 13 was declared a day of national mourning.

 – The Sierra Leone government declared nine days of national mourning.

 – Sri Lankan government declared nine days of national mourning with the flags half-masted.

 – Tanzanian President Julius Nyerere declared nine days of national mourning.

 – The National Assembly of the Republic of China issued a statement on September 10, calling on the mainland compatriots to strengthen the anti-communist struggle against tyranny as soon as the Mao Zedong and the party's internal power struggles intensified, and to destroy the anti-humanity and anti-human rights falsification regime at an early date. Li Yuzhen, chairman of the Republic of China Sports Association, and forty-five individual sports associations have called on mainland athletes to seize the opportunity to visit and compete abroad and to go to freedom.

 – General Secretary and President Nicolae Ceaușescu said in a telegram, "Mao Zedong was a close friend of the Romanian people. He has worked hard to develop the relationship between our two parties, the two countries and the two peoples, to benefit the people of both countries and to the cause of socialism and peace." Romanian government declared September 18 a day of national mourning.

 – Due to the strained Sino-Soviet relations, the Soviet Union only briefly mentioned the death of Mao Zedong in the corner of the official newspaper, and criticized Maoism on Tass.

 – Queen Elizabeth II and Prime Minister James Callaghan said "[Mao’s] influence far exceeds China's borders, and he will undoubtedly be remembered as a world-famous great politician."

 – President Gerald Ford first sent a message to Beijing which said "When I visited Beijing in December 1975, I had the privilege of meeting Chairman Mao. Our conversation has promoted the development of US-China relations along the lines envisioned by our two countries. Please let me declare now as I did then, that the United States is determined to complete the normalization of our relationship on the basis of the Shanghai Communiqué. This will be an appropriate channel to praise his vision and will benefit the people of both countries." In addition, he made the following remarks: "The People's Republic of China, announced today the passing away of Chairman Mao Tse-Tung.  Chairman Mao was a giant figure in modern Chinese History.  He was a leader whose actions profoundly affected the development of his country.  His influence on history will extend far beyond the borders of China.  Americans will remember that it was under Chairman Mao that China moved together with the United States to end a generation of hostility and to launch a new and more positive era in relations between our two countries.  I am confident that the trend of improved relations between the People's Republic of China and the United States, which Chairman Mao helped create, will continue to contribute to world peace and stability.  On behalf of the United States government and the American peoples,  I offer condolences to the government and people of the People's Republic of China. "

 – Venezuelan President Carlos Andrés Pérez announced three days of national mourning with flags half-masted.

 – The Communist Party of Vietnam issued a statement saying "The Vietnamese people will always remember the respectful speech that Chairman Mao said that "the 700 million Chinese people have the strong backing of the Vietnamese people and the vast Chinese territory is the reliable rear of the Vietnamese people." We Vietnamese people are extremely grateful to Mao Zedong. The Chairman, the Chinese Communist Party, the Chinese government and the fraternal Chinese people have given us tremendous and valuable support and assistance to the revolutionary cause."

 – President Josip Broz Tito commented: "The death of Chairman Mao Zedong has caused the Chinese people to lose their most outstanding leader. Without him, modern China would be unimaginable."

Members of the funeral committee 

 Hua Guofeng (member of the Standing Committee of the Political Bureau of the CCP Central Committee, First Vice Chairman of the CCP Central Committee, Premier of the State Council, Minister of Public Security)
 Wang Hongwen (Chairman of the Political Bureau of the CCP Central Committee, Vice Chairman of the CCP Central Committee)
 Ye Jianying (Chairman of the Political Bureau of the CCP Central Committee, Vice Chairman of the Central Committee of the Chinese Communist Party, Secretary General of the Central Military Commission, Minister of National Defense)
 Zhang Chunqiao (President of the Political Bureau of the CCP Central Committee, Vice Premier of the State Council, Standing Committee of the Central Military Commission, Director of the General Political Department of the PLA)

Wei Guoqing, Liu Bocheng, Jiang Qing, Xu Shiyou, Ji Dengkui, Wu De, Wang Dongxing, Chen Yonggui, Chen Xilian, Li Xiannian, Li Desheng, Yao Wenyuan, Wu Guixian, Su Zhenhua, Ni Zhifu, Saifuddin Azizi , Soong Ching Ling, Guo Moruo, Xu Xiangqian, Nie Rongzhen, Chen Yun, Tan Zhenlin, Li Jingquan, Zhang Dingzhen, Cai Chang, Ulanhu, Ngapoi Ngawang Jigme, Zhou Jianren, Xu Dezhen, Hu Yuwen, Li Suwen, Yao Lianwei, Wang Zhen, Yu Qiuli, Gu Mu, Sun Jian, Su Yu, Shen Yanbing, Pagbalha Geleg Namgyai, and Jiang Hua all partook in paying posthumous tributes to Mao.

Funeral and memorial service 

Mao's embalmed, CCP-flag-draped body lay in state at the Great Hall of the People for one week. During this period, one million people (none of them foreign diplomats, and many crying openly or displaying some kind of sadness) filed past Mao to pay their final respects. Chairman Mao's official portrait was hung on the wall, with a banner reading: "Carry on the cause left by Chairman Mao and carry on the cause of proletarian revolution to the end", until September 17. On September 17, Chairman Mao's body was taken in a minibus from the Great Hall of the people to Maojiawan to the 305 Hospital that Li Zhisui directed, and Mao's internal organs were preserved in formaldehyde.

See also 

 
 Death and state funeral of Jiang Zemin

Notes

References 

1976 in China
History of the Chinese Communist Party
Mao Zedong
Mao Zedong
Mao Zedong
20th century in Beijing
September 1976 events in Asia
Mao Zedong
Mao Zedong